The Arsonist is a 1995 Malaysian drama film by U-Wei Haji Saari.

The Arsonist may also refer to:
 The Arsonist (album), an album by Deadlock or its title song
 "The Arsonist" (Puscifer song)
 Randy Cooper or the Arsonist, guitarist

See also
 Arsonists (disambiguation)